The Downtown Loveland Historic District in Loveland, Colorado is an  historic district which was listed on the National Register of Historic Places in 2015. It includes Loveland's commercial center which began in 1877, developed first as a railroad town, and then became an agricultural center and a regional center of government and commerce.

The district includes portions of 4th Street, Loveland's main commercial avenue, from Railroad Avenue to Jefferson Avenue.

It includes 45 contributing buildings and a contributing object, as well as 13 non-contributing buildings and nine non-contributing objects. It includes:
Rialto Theater, 228 East 4th Street, separately NRHP-listed in 1988;
Lovelander Hotel / BPOE Elks Lodge 1051 (1912–13), 103-117 East 4th Street, three stories;
Union Block / Lincoln Hotel, 236-248 East 4th Street, three stories;
Majestic Theatre / I. O. O. F. Hall, 315-319 East 4th Street, three stories;
Colorado and Southern Railway Depot, 409-427 N. Railroad Avenue, separately NRHP-listed in 1988;
State Mercantile Building/Masonic Temple (1910), at 202, 204, 206, 210 East 4th Street. Two-story building constructed of pressed white brick, with a newer red brick veneer.  Parapeted.

See also
National Register of Historic Places listings in Larimer County, Colorado

References

Clocks in the United States
National Register of Historic Places in Larimer County, Colorado
Historic districts on the National Register of Historic Places in Colorado